Wycliffe Musalia Mudavadi (born 21 September 1960) is a Kenyan politician and land economist who is currently serving as the Prime Cabinet Secretary of Kenya. Until October 2022, he was also the party leader of the Amani National Congress (ANC), one of the founding political parties, of the Kenya Kwanza alliance. He served as the 7th Vice-President of Kenya in 2002 and Deputy Prime Minister (2008–2012), when he resigned to contest for the Presidency in the 2013 Kenyan general election and emerged third. He was the deputy party leader of the Orange Democratic Movement (ODM) (2005–2012) and Party Leader of the United Democratic Forum Party (UDF) from May 2012 to July 2015.

Early life and education
Mudavadi, was raised in a Quaker Christian denomination family. He is of the ethnic Maragoli dialect, an extract of the populous Luhya community of western Kenya. After his late father Moses S. B. Mudavadi, he is the only other Kenyan politician who does not swear oaths of office because his faith forbids it.

Mudavadi schooled at Nairobi Primary School,then Jamhuri and Nairobi School  for his A- levels and the University of Nairobi. He pursued a Bachelor of Arts(Land Economics) degree. For sports, he played rugby as a winger for his high school and university's Mean Machine RFC.

Political career

Government career
Mudavadi, first became a Member of Parliament in 1989 when he was elected unopposed in a by-election to take the Sabatia Constituency seat vacated by his deceased father Moses Mudamba Mudavadi. He went on to win the seat in 1992 and 1997 general elections.

Mudavadi has served as Minister for Supplies and Marketing (1989 - 1993), Finance (1993 - 1997), Agriculture (1997 - 1999), Transport, Communications and Information (2000 - 2002). In addition, he has served as Vice-President (2002) and also Deputy Prime Minister and Minister for Local Government of the Republic of Kenya (2008 - 2013).

2002 Election
In late 2002 Mudavadi was the last and shortest serving Vice-President of Kenya under President Daniel arap Moi. Mudavadi ran as Uhuru Kenyatta's running mate in the 2002 election. Despite the support of incumbent President Moi, the Kenyatta/Mudavadi ticket was beaten by Kibaki/Wamalwa and Mudavadi lost his Sabatia parliamentary seat.

2005 Referendum
In 2005 Mudavadi made a political comeback by joining Raila Odinga's Liberal Democratic Party ( LDP)  and aligning himself with the 'No' side in that year's Referendum on the proposed new Constitution amidst speculation that he was set to become the leading Luhya politician.

2007 Election
After the 2005 referendum, the “No” side formed the Orange Democratic Movement- Kenya (ODM-K). But after the ODM-K split, Mudavadi joined the Orange Democratic Movement (ODM) where he rose to the Deputy Party Leader. In 2007 Mudavadi sought the nomination of the ODM candidate for the December 2007 presidential election. On September 1, 2007, Mudavadi came second with 391 votes to Odinga's 2,656 votes in a disputed nomination process. However, along with the other defeated candidates, Mudavadi supported Odinga and Mudavadi was  named Odinga's running mate for the election.

Although the election was officially won by Kibaki, ODM disputed the official results and claimed victory for Odinga. A violent post election crisis developed, which eventually led to the signing of a power-sharing agreement (National Accord) between Kibaki and Odinga. As part of the grand coalition government, Mudavadi was named as Deputy Prime Minister and Minister for Local Government on 13 April 2008. He was the Deputy Prime Minister representing the ODM while Kenyatta was the Deputy Prime Minister representing Kibaki's Party of National Unity. Mudavadi and the rest of the Cabinet were sworn in on 17 April 2008.

Presidential Elections

2013 General Elections

In 2012, Musalia Mudavadi sought for the nomination of ODM to be its presidential candidate for the 2013 General Election. He later on decamped from ODM sighting lack of political freedom in the party. He said the illegal/unconstitutional political mechanisms placed his way made it impossible for any other aspirant to seek a successful free and fair presidential nomination.

Mudavadi left ODM after he was technically locked out of the nomination race through a party constitution clause that gave the party leader a direct nomination as the presidential candidate. Musalia, however, refused to resign as the Deputy Prime Minister of the Republic of Kenya citing that the office was a public office and not a party office. He later took over the United Democratic Front Party (UDF) and became its flag-bearer for the presidential election.

Briefly, he joined Uhuru Kenyatta and William Ruto to form the Jubilee Coalition bringing together UDF, URP and TNA parties. However, Mudavadi left the coalition after a breach of contract which had stated that Uhuru Kenyatta would step down in his favour as the presidential flag-bearer for the UDF/TNA/URP Jubilee coalition. Uhuru surprised the nation by admitting that he indeed signed the agreement but blamed his decision to renege on "dark forces", yet the breach of agreement resulted from fierce objection by Uhuru's supporters insisting that he must be on the presidential ballot. But earlier, Uhuru had insisted that nominations had to be done through voting by party delegates. Mudavadi objected saying the joint candidate had been agreed upon by consensus and that the partners in the Jubilee Coalition were new and didn't have bonafide delegates selected through grassroots elections. Mudavadi made a solo run on UDF and came third in the race, for the top leadership in the country in that election.

2017 General Elections

After the 2013 elections, elements within UDF begun a disruptive scheme to mortgage the party to the ruling Jubilee Coalition. In July 2015 Mudavadi abandoned UDF, which was later dissolved. He formed the Amani National Congress  (ANC) that would take him to the presidential race come 2017. Keenly aware of the configuration of Kenyan elections, Mudavadi formed the National Super Alliance (NASA) coalition and invited the CORD trio of ODM's Raila Odinga, Wiper's Kalonzo Musyoka and Ford-Kenya's Moses Wetang’ula to join. NASA settled on Odinga as its presidential candidate. Mudavadi was the only principal of the NASA not to stand for an elective seat in 2017 general election as he settled for NASA campaign chairman.

2022 General Elections

After the 2017 General Election, the NASA presidential candidate Raila Odinga decided to swear himself in. Mudavadi refused to be part of the swearing-in, terming it unconstitutional. On March 9, 2018, Odinga had signed an armistice with President Uhuru Kenyatta. Since 2018, Mudavadi chose to remain in Opposition.

In March 2021 Mudavadi strategically aligned with the other two NASA Principals Kalonzo Musyoka and Moses Wetang’ula, and KANU Chairman Gideon Moi, to form the One Kenya Alliance (OKA).

Mudavadi supported the presidential candidature of the Deputy President William Ruto and they won the August 9, 2022 General Election against Raila Odinga who had the support of incumbent President Uhuru Kenyatta, with a majority under the Kenya Kwanza Alliance (KKA) that he had formed while still in OKA.

On September 27 2022, President William Ruto issued and signed a Presidential executive order  establishing the office of the Prime Cabinet Secretary of the Republic of Kenya, and nominated Mudavadi to the position. During President Ruto's live address to the nation, he stated that the Office of the Prime Cabinet Secretary (PCS) is the most senior office in the executive arm of the government after that of the President and Deputy President. Mudavadi was officially sworn in as PCS at State House, Kenya on October 27, 2022.

Scandals and Integrity

Graves plot scandal

In March 2010, Deputy Prime Minister Musalia Mudavadi faced investigation by the Kenya Anti-Corruption Commission (KACC) over a Sh283 million cemetery land fraud. KACC officials said the fraud involved the City Council of Nairobi buying land valued at Sh24 million for nearly Sh300 million. Mudavadi protested his innocence and said KACC was being unfair by accusing him without giving him a chance to be heard. In June 2020 according to court records as reported by the Daily Nation, Mudavadi did not benefit from cemetery land deal thus was not culpable in the scandal. It later emerged that Mudavadi did not receive any funds from the scandal neither was he involved in any way in the conspiracy to defraud

LSK blacklist
In January 2012, the Law Society of Kenya (LSK) listed Mudavadi as one of the public officials mentioned adversely in various reports on issues ranging from corruption to economic crimes. The LSK advised voters not to vote those mentioned in the report as they had previously been compromised. According to LSK, the time Mudavadi was blacklisted was a time of a veiled blanket allegations against the Kibaki administration officials such as former President Mwai Kibaki, William Ruto, Charity Ngilu, but without specific allegations levelled against any of them. Thus, the LSK listing was found to have no specific accusation that Mudavadi was culpable to warrant the blacklist.

Personal life
Mudavadi is married to Tessie Mudavadi and they have three children; Moses, Michael and Maryanne. Mudavadi is a fan of English premier league football team Manchester United and Kenyan premier league side AFC leopards. He once served as a patron of AFC leopards. In addition, he is also a golf and rugby enthusiast. He has an autobiography published in 2019 entitled “Musalia Mudavadi: Soaring Above The Storms of Passion”. His nickname in the Kenyan political arena is Mdvd aka Earthquake. In addition, Mudavadi is an ardent fan of old school country music with Kenny Rodgers and Dolly Parton being his favourite musicians.

See also
Musalia Mudavadi Official Website 
Maragoli Cultural Festival
Moses Mudavadi

References

External links 
 

|-

|-

|-

1960 births
Candidates for President of Kenya
Deputy Prime Ministers of Kenya
Kenyan Luhya people
Kenyan Quakers
Leaders of political parties in Kenya
Living people
Members of the National Assembly (Kenya)
Ministers of Agriculture of Kenya
Ministers of Finance of Kenya
Orange Democratic Movement politicians
People from Western Province (Kenya)
United Democratic Forum Party politicians
University of Nairobi alumni
Vice-presidents of Kenya